Leung Yee-tai was a Wing Chun master of the late Qing Dynasty.

Background
Leung Yee-tai had become associated with Tiandihui and anti-Qing Dynasty resistance.

He was a strong boatman who steered a riverboat by pushing a long pole against the river bottom.
A Shaolin monk Chi Sin (至善禪師) saw that he was a natural successor to the Southern Shaolin pole fighting skill called six and a half point long pole.

He taught Wong Wah-bo his pole fighting skill in exchange for the Wing Chun fist-fighting skill. Though he was a student of Wong in Wing Chun, he was actually Wong's sifu in the pole fighting skill. Wong modified the pole fighting skills using Wing Chun principles. The modified pole skill had since part of Wing Chun skills set.

He met Leung Jan of Foshan, a young herbal doctor, when he was sick. He then trained Leung Jan when he was already an old man at over sixty years of age. He went on to introduce Jan to Wong. Because both of Wong and Jan were from Gulao (古勞) Village, Wong imparted his full system of Wing Chun skills to him.

Lineage

In popular culture
Leung Yee-tai was portrayed by Kong Ngai in the 1981 TVB television drama series Kung Fu Master of Fat Shan.

He was portrayed by Lam Ching-ying in the 1981 Sammo Hung film The Prodigal Son.

In the 2005 TVB television drama series Real Kung Fu, he was portrayed by Bryan Leung.

References
First and Pole at www.leungting.com

Chinese Wing Chun practitioners